Dr. Bhubaneswar Borooah Cancer Institute (BBCI) is a cancer care hospital and research centre in Guwahati, India. It is a grants-in-aid institute of Department of Atomic Energy, Government of India, and a unit of Tata Memorial Centre, Mumbai and Dr.Amal Chandra Kataki M.D, Director of Dr. Bhubaneswar Borooah Cancer Institute. BBCI is a Regional Cancer Centre recognized by the Government of India.

References

External links
 Official website

Hospital buildings completed in 1973
Cancer hospitals
Regional Cancer Centres in India
Hospitals in Assam
Research institutes in Assam
1973 establishments in Assam
20th-century architecture in India